The Thermesiini are a tribe of moths in the family Erebidae.

Genera

Ascalapha
Feigeria
Hemeroblemma
Latebraria
Letis
Thysania

References

 
Erebinae
Moth tribes